The 1981 Sirch earthquake occurred at 00:22 local time (17:22 UTC) on July 28. It had a magnitude of 7.1 on the surface wave magnitude scale and a maximum perceived intensity of IX (Violent) on the Mercalli intensity scale. The epicentre was in the province of Kerman in eastern Iran. The earthquake caused the destruction of Kerman and serious damage to towns and villages in the surrounding area. The estimated number of deaths is 1,500, with a further 1,000 injured, 50,000 homeless, and extensive damage in the Kerman Region.

This is the largest event in the Kerman province since the 1981 Golbaf earthquake that killed 3,000 people. The 2003 Bam earthquake was the most significant earthquake in the Kerman Province.

See also 
 List of earthquakes in 1981
 List of earthquakes in Iran
 2003 Bam earthquake

References

Further reading

External links

1981 Dasht-e Bayaz and Ferdows
Sirch Earthquake, 1968
Earthquake